Foster Peninsula is a high ice-covered peninsula between Palmer Inlet and Lamplugh Inlet on the east coast of Palmer Land, Antarctica. It was mapped by the United States Geological Survey in 1974, and was named by the Advisory Committee on Antarctic Names for Theodore D. Foster, a United States Antarctic Research Program oceanographer on the International Weddell Sea Expedition, 1969. He was party leader on Weddell Sea investigations, 1972–73 and 1974–75.

References 

Peninsulas of Palmer Land